The Lecithoceridae, or long-horned moths, are a family of small moths described by Simon Le Marchand in 1947. Although lecithocerids are found throughout the world, the great majority are found in the Indomalayan realm and the southern part of the Palaearctic realm.

Systematics
The Lecithoceridae belong to the superfamily Gelechioidea, and comprises over 100 genera and nearly 900 species. The family is divided into these subfamilies:
Lecithocerinae
Torodorinae Gozmány in Amsel et al., 1978
Ceuthomadarinae Gozmány, 1978
Park (2015) recently proposed another subfamily Crocanthinae, mainly based on Crocanthes Meyrick. The new subfamily include Crocanthes Meyrick, Aprosesta Turner, st. rev. (which is resurrected as a valid genus), Lamprista Park, Pacificulla Park, Hannara Park, and Gonaepa Walker.

Unplaced to subfamily
Crocanthes group
Crocanthes Meyrick, 1886
Cophomantella T. B. Fletcher, 1940
Hannara Park in Park & Lee, 2013
Pacificulla Park in Park & Lee, 2013
Lamprista Park & Lee, 2013
Martyringa group
Martyringa Busck, 1902
Other genera
Aproparia Gozmány, 1972
Asmenistis Meyrick, 1925
Cynicocrates Meyrick, 1935
Cynicostola Meyrick, 1925
Enthetica Meyrick, 1916
Epimactis Meyrick, 1907
Galoxestis Wu, 1994
Heteroderces Meyrick, 1929
Hypochasmia Meyrick, 1929
Hyptiastis Meyrick, 1911
Isotypa Janse, 1954
Longipenis Wu, 1994
Malachoherca Wu, 1994
Merocrates Meyrick, 1931
Mexytocerus Viette, 1989
Monerista Meyrick, 1925
Olbothrepta Meyrick, 1925
Opacoptera Gozmány in Amsel et al., 1978
Phanoschista Meyrick, 1925
Phatnotis Meyrick, 1913
Philarachnis Meyrick, 1925
Placanthes Meyrick, 1923
Plagiocrossa Janse, 1954
Pompographa Gozmány, 1971
Proesochtha Wu, 1994
Ptilothyris Walsingham, 1897
Rhyparomatrix Gozmány, 1972
Scaeostrepta Meyrick, 1931
Scythostola Meyrick, 1925
Sisyrodonta Meyrick, 1922
Sphaerolbia Meyrick, 1934
Stryphnocopa Meyrick, 1920
Thamnopalpa Gozmány in Amsel et al., 1978
Urolaguna Wu, 1994

References

 
Moth families
Gelechioidea